North Pearsall is a census-designated place (CDP) in Frio County, Texas, United States. The population was 614 at the 2010 census.

Geography
North Pearsall is located in central Frio County at  (28.919296, -99.092906). It is bordered to the south by the city of Pearsall, the county seat. Interstate 35 forms the western edge of the CDP, with access from Exit 104.

Demographics

As of the census of 2000, 561 people, 162 households, and 139 families were residing in the CDP. The population density was 420.3 people per mi2 (162.9/km2). The 176 housing units averaged 131.9/sq mi (51.1/km2). The racial makeup of the CDP was 72.55% White, 1.25% Native American, 24.42% from other races, and 1.78% from two or more races. Hispanics or Latinos of any race were 82.00% of the population.

Of the 162 households, 58.0% had children under the age of 18 living with them, 68.5% were married couples living together, 10.5% had a female householder with no husband present, and 13.6% were not families. About 10.5% of all households were made up of individuals, and 4.9% had someone living alone who was 65 years of age or older. The average household size was 3.46, and the average family size was 3.73.

In the CDP, the age distribution was 37.4% under 18, 9.6% from 18 to 24, 30.3% from 25 to 44, 18.9% from 45 to 64, and 3.7% who were 65 or older. The median age was 27 years. For every 100 females, there were 94.1 males. For every 100 females age 18 and over, there were 101.7 males.

The median income for a household in the CDP was $32,917, and for a family was $35,000. Males had a median income of $26,667 versus $17,167 for females. The per capita income for the CDP was $11,602. About 8.3% of families and 8.1% of the population were below the poverty line, including 8.7% of those under age 18 and 11.3% of those age 65 or over.

Education
North Pearsall is served by the Pearsall Independent School District.

References

Census-designated places in Frio County, Texas
Census-designated places in Texas